Roger J. Robach (June 21, 1934 – September 29, 1991) was an American politician from New York who served in the New York State Assembly from 1975 to 1991.

Life and career
Robach was born on June 21, 1934, in Rochester, New York. He attended Holy Apostles School. Robach continued his studies for six years at Catholic seminaries, but eventually abandoned his pursuit of the priesthood. On September 1, 1956, he married Teresa Fallocco. The Robachs had three children, among them future Assemblymember and State Senator Joseph Robach (born 1958). From 1956 to 1958, Roger Robach served in the U.S. Army. He graduated with a degree in business administration from the University of Rochester in 1966. Robach retired from Eastman Kodak in 1985.

Robach entered politics as a Democrat, and was a member of the Monroe County Legislature from 1973 to 1974. He was a member of the New York State Assembly from 1975 until his death in 1991, sitting in the 181st, 182nd, 183rd, 184th, 185th, 186th, 187th, 188th and 189th New York State Legislatures. He served as Deputy Assembly Majority Leader from 1987 to 1991.

Robach died of heart disease on September 29, 1991, at Strong Memorial Hospital in Rochester, New York. He was buried at Holy Sepulchre Cemetery.

References

1934 births
1991 deaths
Politicians from Rochester, New York
Indiana University Bloomington alumni
Democratic Party members of the New York State Assembly
University of Rochester alumni
20th-century American politicians